Rastriya Janamorcha is a political party in Nepal. It was originally founded in 1995 as the legal front of Communist Party of Nepal (Masal). Former Deputy Prime Minister, Chitra Bahdur KC is the chairman of the party.

It was re-founded again in 2006 after breaking away from Janamorcha Nepal and still acts as the legal front for the Mohan Bikram Singh led Communist Party of Nepal (Masal). The party remains as a strong force political force mainly in Baglung and Pyuthan district.  

The party advocates decentralization within the former unitary system.

History

Before formation (1991–1994) 
The party contested the 1991 local elections as All Nepal Peasants Organization and contested in the 1994 legislative elections as All Nepal Rastriya Janamorcha.

Merger and break away (2002–2008) 
In 2002, the party merged with Samyukta Janamorcha Nepal the legal front of Communist Party of Nepal (Unity Centre) to form Janamorcha Nepal. Janamorcha Nepal acted as the legal front of the Communist Party of Nepal (Unity Centre-Masal). After Janamorcha Nepal joined the governing Seven Party Alliance in 2006, Chitra Bahadur KC broke away from the party to reclaim the name of Rastriya Janamorcha. The party held three seats in the Interim Legislature Parliament of Nepal.

Constituent Assembly (2008–2015) 
The party registered at the Election Commission of Nepal ahead of the 2008 Constituent Assembly elections. The party won four seats in the election.

In July 2010, the party expelled its General secretary Dilaram Acharya for breaking party discipline. He formed another party, Rastriya Janamorcha (Nepal) after his expulsion. The  party won three seats in the 2013 Constituent Assembly election.

Federal Nepal (2015–present) 
After the promulgation of the Constitution of Nepal, Rastriya Janamorcha joined the coalition government of Communist Party of Nepal (Unified Marxist-Leninist) and Unified Communist Party of Nepal (Maoist). This was the first time that the party had not been in opposition. Following this, party Chairman Chitra Bahadur KC was appointed Deputy Prime Minister and Minister for Cooperatives and Poverty Alleviation.

The party contested the 2017 Nepalese local elections and won 186 seats in local government. The party won mayoral posts in Bareng Rural Municipality in Baglung, Jhimruk and Malarani Rural Municipalities in Pyuthan. Ahead of the 2017 legislative and provincial elections, the party joined the alliance of Communist Party of Nepal (Unified Marxist-Leninist) and Communist Party of Nepal (Maoist Centre). The party won one seat to the Federal Parliament of Nepal but did not cross the three percent threshold to become a national party. The party also won three seats in the Provincial Assembly of Gandaki Province and one seat in the Provincial Assembly of Lumbini Province. 

After the Nepalese political crisis in 2021, Rastriya Janamorcha stood in support of alliance led by Nepali Congress. It played major role in forming new government in Gandaki Province. It gave external support and confidence to central government led by Sher Bahadur Deuba. The party was given a seat in National Assembly and hence Tul Prasad B.K. was elected as first National Assemblian from the party.

Electoral performance

Legislative elections

Provincial elections

Gandaki

Lumbini

Leadership

Chairmen 
 Chitra Bahadur K.C., 1999–2002 and 2006–present

General secretaries 
 Nawaraj Subedi, 1999–2002
 Dilaram Acharya, 2006–2010
 Santa Bahadur Nepali, 2011–2016
 Janak Raj Sharma, 2016–2021
 Manoj Bhatta, 2021-present

List of Members of Parliament  

List of Pratinidhi Sabha members from Rastriya Janamorcha

Sister organisations 
 All Nepal Trade Union Congress
 All Nepal Women's Association
 ANNISU (6th)
 All Nepal Janatati Conference
 Jatiya Samata Samaj
 All Nepal Democratic Youth Association
 Raktim Sanskritik Pariwar
 Akhil Nepal Buddhijibi Sangh
 All Nepal Teachers' Association

See also 

 List of political parties in Nepal

References

Communist parties in Nepal
2006 establishments in Nepal
Political parties established in 2006